The Defence Secretary of Pakistan is the  Federal Secretary for Ministry of Defence of Pakistan.

List of Defence Secretaries

See also 
Cabinet Secretary of Pakistan
Establishment Secretary of Pakistan
Foreign Secretary of Pakistan
Finance Secretary of Pakistan
Interior Secretary of Pakistan

References

External links 
Ministry of Defence Year Book 2004-2005

Defence Secretaries of Pakistan